Glass OS (Google XE) is a version of Google's Android operating system designed for Google Glass. "glass-omap" Tag is used in referring to the modified Android code which can be found inside Kernel Repository.

Release history 
The following list shows the main changes happened for each update release. For more detailed release notes visit the support website.

April 11, 2013: XE4.0 
Initial release.

May 7, 2013: XE5.0 
XE5 updates included:
 Change to sync policy: require power + WiFi for background uploads
 Crash reporting
 Incoming G+ notifications (direct shares, comments, +mentions), including ability to comment and +1
 Incoming Hangout notifications
 Transcription of queries & messages is now wicked-fast
 Long-press to search from anywhere in the UI (no longer just from off)
 International number dialing + SMS
 Hop animation on disallowed swipes in the UI
 New On-Head Detection calibration flow
 Show device Serial Number on Device Info card
 More reliable estimation of battery charge remaining
 New recipient-list mosaic

June 4, 2013: XE6.0 
XE6 updates include:
 Better photos through Glass
 Voice annotate your photos and videos when sharing
 Improvements to On-Head Detection. Please re-calibrate to enable the improvements.
 Improved cards in Google Now for Sports, and a new card for Birthdays
 Fixes for several issues

Glass OS update 
Glass updates by itself automatically over the air. Glass will check Google servers periodically for updates. When an update is available, Glass will download it to the device and will install the update all by itself. This happens under the condition of active battery charging and a reliable Wi-Fi connection.

References 

2013 software
Android (operating system)
Augmented reality
Google operating systems